Walking in Circles is an American comedy web series created by Adam Rady and James Rodehaver. The show revolves around a group of adventurers on a quest to slay Sithalazalamazar, a dragon who had previously killed one of the adventurer's fathers. The series has been described by its creators as "The Office meets Lord of the Rings." The show itself follows a mockumentary format, featuring "whip-smart dialogue" with much of the humor derived from role-playing games like Dungeons & Dragons.

The series premiered on YouTube on July 19, 2011. The remaining ten episodes were released on a weekly basis via YouTube. The creators are currently gathering funding for a second season.

In 2016, the series won the award for Best Fantasy Series at the Vancouver Web Series Festival.

External links
 The Official Website of Walking in Circles
 Walking in Circles YouTube Channel

References

American comedy web series